Amuesha, Amoesha, and Yanesha' may refer to two things:

 The Yanesha' people of Peru
 The Yanesha' language, spoken by the Yanesha' people